The list of museums in the Republic of Artsakh encompasses museums defined for this context as institutions (including nonprofit organizations, government entities, and private businesses) that collect and care for objects of cultural, artistic, scientific, or historical interest and make their collections or related exhibits available for public viewing.  Museums that exist only in cyberspace (i.e., virtual museums) are not included.  Also included are non-profit art galleries and exhibit spaces.

See also
 List of museums
 Tourism in Artsakh

References

Artsakh
Artsakh
Republic of Artsakh culture
Tourist attractions in the Republic of Artsakh